The 2021 European Korfball A-Championship will be held in Belgium from 25 to 30 October 2021. Matches will be played in Antwerp. It will be the second edition where the European Korfball Championship is split into an A-Championship and a B-Championship. The tournament will serve as a qualifier for the 2023 IKF World Korfball Championship.

Qualified teams

Venues
All group stages matches were organized at Boeckenberg Sportcenter in Deurne. Knockout stage matches were organized in the Lotto Arena in Merksem.

Group stage

Group A

Group B

Knockout stage

Classification 5th-8th place

Final standing

External links
Official website

References

European Korfball Championship
2021 in korfball
2021 in Belgian sport
International sports competitions hosted by Belgium
Korfball in Belgium